International classical guitar competitions are public events designed to identify and award outstanding classical guitar soloists, ensembles, and composers. They allow artists to promote themselves and gain exposure. Some competitions also have newly composed "set" pieces which serve to increase the classical guitar repertoire.

Early history
The guitar seems to be the absentee in musical competitions until the Second World War. 
 In 1949 the "First Guitar Competition", now the Tokyo International Guitar Competition was held and the Modern Japan Guitar Federation was established in Tokyo, Japan. It was not held in 1954, 1955, and 1956, but continued from the 6th edition since 1957. From the 25th edition in 1982 became the Tokyo International Guitar Competition.
 The first international guitar performance competitions in Europe were promoted and initiated in the 1950s by virtuoso Spanish guitarist Andrés Segovia. In 1956 he managed to get the guitar discipline to be included in prestigious multi-instrumental Geneva International Music Competition. 
 The 1960s led to born within the compass of Segovia two European competitions that marked the history of guitar and which remains active until today, i.e. 1967 - International Guitar Competition "Francisco Tárrega" in Benicàssim, Spain and 1968 - Competition "Premio Città di Alessandria" in Alessandria, Italy, which in 1995 would be renamed International Classical Guitar Competition "Michele Pittaluga - Premio Città di Alessandria" on the occasion of its founder passing. Over time, Segovia kept promoting competitions by giving his support to ones which had evident professionalism contents.
 Between 1959 and 1990s the Concours International de Guitare was organized by O.R.T.F., which then became Radio France. The competition was born at the behest of Robert J. Vidal, deputy producer of the French radio station. In 2007 a new competition, International Classical Guitar Competition Robert J. Vidal in Barbezieux, France was established in his memory.
 In 1972 Giuliano Balestra founded International Guitar Competition "Fernando Sor" in Rome, Italy
 Since 1973 the city of Gargnano, Italy has been hosting the "Incontri Chitarristici" which included the International Classical Guitar Competition, since 1976.
 In 1982 the Guitar Foundation of America International Concert Artist Competition was established and shortly became one of the most desired awards in the classical guitar world thus given a start to classical guitar popularisation in the US.
 In 1985, the European Year of Music, Andrés Segovia International Classical Guitar Competition was established in La Herradura, Spain in the honor of maestro.

Present times
In recent years, many international classical guitar competitions were established.
 The overall level of the competitions was raised by increasing prizes value up to $30,000 in the US,  $22,000 in Europe, and $10,000 in Asia.
 Finals with the orchestra became more common.
 Introduction of online streaming of the competition rounds and YouTube applications greatly improved neutrality and public reception of the judgment.
 Many classical guitar competitions now take place during guitar festivals, and therefore the competition event can be attended by the general public, as an audience.
 Youth international competitions became more popular, attracting children and amateurs by the lower comp level and affordable prizes.

Competitors
 In the international classical guitar competitions, the typical age of the competitors is from 18 to 35. Some competitions don't have age restrictions.
 The youth competitions are usually up to 25 years old.
 As a result of an increased number of competitions, some competitors have won unusual (more than 15) number of 1st Prizes in the professional (adult) competitions: 19 - Marcin Dylla, 19 - Goran Krivokapić, 50 - Marko Topchii.

List of international competitions for classical guitar

US and Americas

Europe

Asia, Australia, and Oceania

Youth and Discontinued
Discontinued (inactive)

Youth (junior) competitions

Thoughts on competitions

Denis Azabagić has written: "Competitions give you a very valuable experience. Do they guide in your artistic development? I do not know if it benefits the guitarist in that area, but I think it does benefit the student because it helps him to set goals under pressure (having a deadline). This creates a great deal of stress, which you will have to learn how to deal with. To perform live in front of a jury is something that requires some training. Finally, if you are successful at winning competitions, this will help you to promote your name in the guitar circle, you will start to be noticed. I think winning competitions helps you build a name but does not help much to develop your artistry."
In this interview recorded in early 2002, Azabagic stresses that while competitions were very good to him, competitions can also be devastating to worthy musicians who never seem to win.

Modern criticism of guitar competitions is actually quite common.  Some criticisms are that they are often judged by unqualified judges, that reward people for being technically proficient without regard to musicality. But concerning the judging of musicality, this is in itself controversial, as the question arises, on how to judge art on any objective level.

John Williams has said: "[...] basically I don't like or approve of competitions on any instrument. I don't think music can be evaluated like a race - I know that's an obvious thing to say and that there are many ifs and buts involved because they do help some artists and concentrate the public's attention on music. But I particularly don't like the way many guitar competitions are run, the confusing waypoints are awarded differently in each round of a competition, and especially the over-exploitation of the "Big Winner" and the competitive values that puts on players and the activity of guitar playing itself. Winning is a matter of taste in most cases, and there are often many other equally deserving competitors other than just the First Prize recipient. I feel it would be fairer to have a select group of finalists, each of whom receives the same award and status.I have served on juries in the past, but these days I refuse to take part, and I feel it is important to take that stand otherwise your reservations have no meaning. Having said all that, I know it happens anyway and sometimes there is sponsorship involved which does help the general public interest and support. But it still doesn't need to be a cut and dried thing, where each finalist is ranked as precisely as 1,2,3. I think it is those competitive values that are wrong, not the celebration of excellence in music as such. I have talked about the idea of setting up a competition where this other approach is used, but nothing definite has emerged from it yet; it may take some time to develop."

Analysis of data at a piano competition, with many high-level participants, has made it doubtful that judges are able to make fully objective judgments; because there was a small correlation between the order of appearance of participants and their ranking:
We find that the order and timing of appearance at the competition are good predictors of the final ranking. [...] Because of this, order and timing are unique instrumental variables for the final ranking, which we consistently find to have a significant impact on later success, irrespective of the finalists’ true quality. Pianists with high scores are more likely to see their work recorded later on. It is also worth pointing out that the opinion of music critics is more influenced by the ranking than by the quality of the performers. This is not necessarily surprising, since there are many musicians who may have been good during the competition, but have vanished afterward, leaving the critics recollections unaffected.The conclusion that it pays to do well in the competition is strongly supported by the data. However, the fact that judges’ rankings are affected by order and timing of appearance in a competition needs to be stressed, and sheds some doubt on their ability to cast fully objective judgments.
On the other hand, if a competition has many professional-level artistic participants, it may not even be possible to make an objective judgment of who is "best"; because: given numerous professional-level artistic performers, there may not even be room for the concept of comparison; since this presumes the existence of a "best" interpretation, which is itself questionable (and would be a commercialization of art; viewing it from a mass-consumption or absolutist point of view).

Bibliography
On Competitions - Dealing with Performance Stress by Denis Azabagic

References

Further reading
Music Competitions - Who Wins? by Linda Anne Engelhardt
Changes in Piano Competitions Alter How Juries Use Their Many "Texts" by Sean Bennett (2002)
The Dark Side of Piano Competitions (August 7, 2009)
Playing Up A Storm: The Great Debate (Sydney Morning Herald; Friday, July 7, 2000)
Winning beginnings (January 10, 2002)
Yugoslav Pianist: the Man "Who Killed Chopin" (alluding to those jurors, who could not accept a stunning emotional Chopin-interpretation; simply because it was different from the playing they were used to) (originally published in 11.11.1980)
Can a Pianist Sway a Competition Jury? (May 25, 1989)
In Competitions, the Fun Is Being Called for Jury Duty (December 18, 1988)
Piano Juror by Leslie Gerber
The murky music prize by Jessica Duchen (The Independent; 21 April 2009)
Behind the scenes at piano competitions by Michael Johnson (27.08.2009)
'Trill' goes behind scenes in music world by Edward Reichel (Aug. 22, 2009)
Brain, heart and fingers Music: Judging a piano competition requires comparing performances that are often very different, and all good (July 28, 1998)

Classical guitar